The 2012 World Junior A Challenge was an international Junior "A" ice hockey tournament organized by Hockey Canada. It was hosted in Yarmouth, Nova Scotia, from November 5–12, 2012, at the Mariners Centre. The event also included the 8th annual Canadian Junior Hockey League Prospects Game Challenge, marking the second time the two events have been paired together.

Teams
 Canada East (7th Appearance, 2nd as Hosts)
 Canada West (7th Appearance)
 Russia (7th Appearance)
 Switzerland (2nd Appearance)
 United States (6th Appearance)
 Czech Republic (2nd Appearance)

Background
Canada East, Canada West, Russia, United States, and Czech Republic all return.  Switzerland is back after a hiatus, replacing Sweden.

Exhibition schedule

2012 Tournament

Group A

Group B

Results

Championship Round

Final standings

Statistics

Scorers

Goaltenders

Awards
Most Valuable Player: Vince Hinostroza (United States)
All-Star Team
Forwards: Vince Hinostroza (United States), Wade Murphy (Canada West), Sandro Zangger (Switzerland)
Defense: Brady (United States), Stecher (Canada West)
Goalie: Jonah Imoo (Canada West)

Rosters

Canada East

Players: Adrian Ignagni, St. Michael's (OJHL); Jason Pucciarelli, Newmarket (OJHL); Randy Gazzola, Trenton (OJHL); Paul Geiger, Stouffville, (OJHL); Phil Hampton, Oakville (OJHL); Ben Hutton, Kemptville (CCHL); Kevin Lough, Cumberland (CCHL); MacKenzie Weegar, Nepean (CCHL); Aidan Wright, Kingston (OJHL); Drake Caggiula, Stouffville (OJHL); Justin Danforth, Cobourg (OJHL); Jeff DiNallo, Newmarket (OJHL); Kyle Dutra, Toronto Lakeshore (OJHL); David Friedmann, Toronto (OJHL); Daniel Leavens, Newmarket, (OJHL); Patrick Megannety, Georgetown (OJHL); Daniel Milne, St. Michael's (OJHL); Michael Neville, St. Michael's (OJHL); Braedan Russell, Oakville (OJHL); Devin Shore, Whitby (OJHL); Tylor Spink, Cornwall (CCHL); Tyson Spink, Cornwall (CCHL).

Staff:

Canada West
 Players:

Staff:

Russia
 Players:

Staff:

Switzerland
 Players:

Staff:

Czech Republic
 Players:

Staff:

United States

Players:

Staff:

CJHL Prospects Game

For the second consecutive year, the Canadian Junior Hockey League Prospects Game was a part of the WJAC festivities.  Just like the previous three Prospects Games, the event was actually two "prospect" games with the President's Cup going to the winning goal aggregate.

Summary

Game One

Game Two

Results

Rosters

East Prospects
Players:

Staff:

West Prospects
Players:

Staff:

External links
HC's WJAC Website

World Junior A Challenge
World Junior A Challenge
World Junior A Challenge
Yarmouth, Nova Scotia